King of the Damned is a 1935 British prison film directed by Walter Forde and starring Conrad Veidt, Helen Vinson, Noah Beery and Cecil Ramage.

Plot summary
Convict 83 is a prisoner on an island, where the harsh regime of the Governor pushes him to lead a revolt.

Cast
 Conrad Veidt - Convict 83
 Helen Vinson - Anna Fernandez
 Noah Beery - Convict 98
 Cecil Ramage - Major Montez
 Edmund Willard - The Greek
 Percy Parsons - Lumberjack
 Peter Croft - Boy convict
 Raymond Lovell - Captain Torres
 C. M. Hallard - Commandant
 Allan Jeayes - Doctor Prada
 Percy Walsh - Captain Perez
 Gibson Gowland - Priest

Production
To avoid the usual French protests on films depicting Devil's Island, the producers gave all locations Spanish names and set the film in the Caribbean.

References

1935 films
British prison drama films
Films directed by Walter Forde
British black-and-white films
Films scored by Jack Beaver
Gaumont Film Company films
1930s prison films
1930s English-language films
1930s British films